Charles C. Cockroft (March 20, 1887 – October 16, 1970) was a provincial politician from Alberta, Canada. He served as a member of the Legislative Assembly of Alberta from 1935 to 1940, sitting with the Social Credit caucus in government. He was Provincial Treasurer of Alberta from September 3, 1935	to February 2, 1937.

References

Alberta Social Credit Party MLAs
1970 deaths
1887 births
Finance ministers of Alberta
People from Leeds
British emigrants to Canada
Members of the Executive Council of Alberta